Pleurothallis microcardia is a species of orchid plant native to Bolivia, Colombia, Ecuador, Peru.

References 

chachatoynsis
Flora of Colombia
Flora of Bolivia
Flora of Ecuador
Flora of Peru